Gunupudi Viswanath Sastri, popularly known by his screen name Ironleg Sastri, was an Indian comedian who predominantly worked in Telugu-language films. He acted in more than 150 films. E. V. V. Satyanarayana introduced him to Telugu Cinema.

Life 
Ironlog Sastri was born in a Brahmin family in Tadepalligudem, Andhra Pradesh, India. His birth name was Gunupudi Vishwanatha Sastry. He used to work as a priest for the movie inaugural functions. Director E. V. V. Satyanarayana offered him a role in Appula Appa Rao (1991) where he played the role of a priest with the name Ironleg Sastry. Later he adopted this as his screen name.

Filmography
 Yours Abhi (2004)
 Toli Choopulone (2003)
 Premalo Pavani Kalyan (2002)
Badri (2000)
 Swayamvaram (1999)
 Dady (1999)
 Thammudu (1999)
 Aavida Maa Aavide (1998)
 Veedevadandi Babu (1997)
 Circus Sattipandu (1997)
 Maavichiguru (1996)
 Aame (1994)
 Pekata Papa Rao (1993)
Evandi Aavida Vachindi (1993)
Jamba Lakidi Pamba (1992)
 Appula Appa Rao (1991)
 Rowdy Alludu (1991)
 Prema Khaidi (1990)
 Abbai Premalo Paddadu
 Chance
 Little Gang

Death
He suffered with heart problems in 2006. He died on 19 June 2006 at his native place Tadepalligudem. He also suffered with jaundice in the last days of life. His family appealed to Film industry and AP Government to financially support them.

References 

Telugu comedians
Telugu male actors
2006 deaths
Year of birth missing